Mercy Regional Medical Center is a general hospital in Durango, Colorado, in La Plata County. Originally established in 1882, the hospital has 82 beds. The hospital's current campus opened in June 2006. It is located east of downtown Durango in the city's Grandview neighborhood.

The hospital is a Level III trauma center.

References

External links
Hospital website
 

Hospitals in Colorado
Buildings and structures in La Plata County, Colorado
Hospitals established in 1882
1882 establishments in Colorado
Durango, Colorado